And-Jëf/Revolutionary Movement for New Democracy (in French: And-Jëf/Mouvement Révolutionnaire pour la Démocratie Nouvelle) was a Marxist-Leninist political party in Senegal.

And-Jëf (Wolof for 'Act Together') was founded by Reenu-Rew at a clandestine congress on December 28, 1974.

Most of the leadership, including the main leader Landing Savané, was jailed in 1975. Savané was released in 1976, and resumed political activity.

And-Jëf was very active within the trade union movement UTLS.

In March 1980 And-Jëf started the publication Jaay Doolé Bi (The Proletarian).

In July 1981 the group was registered as a legal political party under the name And-Jëf/MRDN.

In 1991 And-Jëf/MRDN was one of the founding members of And-Jëf/African Party for Democracy and Socialism (AJ/PADS).

Source: Zuccarelli, François. La vie politique sénégalaise (1940-1988). Paris: CHEAM, 1988.

Political parties established in 1974
Communist parties in Senegal
Defunct Maoist parties
Maoism in Africa